UFC 269: Oliveira vs. Poirier was a mixed martial arts event produced by the Ultimate Fighting Championship that took place on December 11, 2021, at the T-Mobile Arena in Paradise, Nevada, part of the Las Vegas Metropolitan Area, United States.

Background
A UFC Lightweight Championship bout between current champion Charles Oliveira and former interim champion Dustin Poirier served as the event headliner.

A UFC Women's Bantamweight Championship bout between current champion Amanda Nunes (also current UFC Women's Featherweight Champion) and The Ultimate Fighter: Team Rousey vs. Team Tate bantamweight winner Julianna Peña took place at the event. The pairing was previously scheduled to take place at UFC 265, but it was postponed after Nunes tested positive for COVID-19.

A UFC Flyweight Championship trilogy bout between current champion Brandon Moreno and former champion Deiveson Figueiredo was expected to take place at the event. The pairing first met at UFC 256 on December 12, 2020, resulting in a majority draw (Figueiredo retained the title). Their second meeting took place at UFC 263 on June 12, where Moreno captured the title by submission in the third round. Subsequently, the bout was moved to UFC 270 due to the addition of a welterweight bout between Jorge Masvidal and Leon Edwards. Masvidal later withdrew due to injury in early November and the bout was scrapped.

A flyweight bout between former title challenger Alex Perez and Matt Schnell had been rescheduled for UFC Fight Night: Brunson vs. Till. They were originally expected to meet at UFC 262, before Perez was forced to pull out due to undisclosed reasons. They were then booked again at UFC on ESPN: Barboza vs. Chikadze, before being shifted to this event. However, the bout was yet again postponed for unknown reasons to this event. Shortly after, officials announced that the bout had been cancelled as Schnell was forced to withdraw due to a medical issue.

A women's flyweight bout between Montana De La Rosa and Maycee Barber was expected to take place at the event. However, De La Rosa pulled out of the fight in early October citing injury and she was replaced by Erin Blanchfield. In turn, Barber withdrew in early November due to undisclosed reasons. Miranda Maverick was announced as her replacement.

A middleweight bout between André Muniz and Dricus Du Plessis was scheduled for the event. However, Du Plessis withdrew from the event due to injury and was replaced by Eryk Anders.

A heavyweight bout between Augusto Sakai and Tai Tuivasa was scheduled for UFC Fight Night: Vieira vs. Tate, but it was scrapped due to visa issues. It took place at this event instead.

At the weigh-ins, Priscila Cachoeira weighed in at 129 pounds, 3 pounds over the flyweight non-title fight limit. Her bout proceeded at a catchweight and she was fined 30% of her purse, which went to her opponent Gillian Robertson.

Results

Bonus awards
The following fighters received $50,000 bonuses.
 Fight of the Night: Dominick Cruz vs. Pedro Munhoz 
 Performance of the Night: Charles Oliveira, Julianna Peña, Kai Kara-France, Sean O'Malley, Tai Tuivasa, and Bruno Silva

See also

 List of UFC events
 List of current UFC fighters
 2021 in UFC

References

Ultimate Fighting Championship events
2021 in mixed martial arts
Events in Paradise, Nevada
December 2021 sports events in the United States
2021 in sports in Nevada
Mixed martial arts in Las Vegas
Sports competitions in Las Vegas